Margeret Severn  (14 August 1901 – 7 July 1997) was an internationally acclaimed dancer who was most famous for using more than a dozen different Benda masks in the Greenwich Village Follies of 1921. She also played a dancer in the film The Good Provider (1922).

A film about her work, Dance Masks, was made by Peter Lipskis, distributed by The University of California, Berkeley Extension Media Center, and reviewed by Choice.

References

External links

1901 births
1997 deaths
American female dancers
20th-century American dancers
20th-century American women